Jinju Dongbang clan was one of the Korean clans. Their Bon-gwan was in Jinju, South Gyeongsang Province. According to the research in 2000, the number of Jinju Dongbang clan was 98. Dongbang clan was born in Jinan, China. Fuxi made surname East because he was a citizen of zhèn. He passed Imperial examination in 1792. It is not clear that how Jinju Dongbang clan were established in Korea.

See also 
 Korean clan names of foreign origin

References

External links 
 

 
Korean clan names of Chinese origin